Panakkaran is a 1990 Indian Tamil-language masala film directed by P. Vasu. A remake of the Hindi film Lawaaris (1981), it stars Rajinikanth and Gautami. The film was released on 14 January 1990, Pongal day, and ran for more than 175 days in theatres.

Plot 
Sumithra is a famous singer and she is in love with Vijayakumar, a leading business man. She gets pregnant before wedding but Vijayakumar wants it to be aborted. Sumithra, who doesn't want to abort her child, decides to break up with Vijayakumar and she leaves with her brother Radharavi without informing Vijayakumar. Sumithra gives birth to a baby boy but Radharavi takes away the baby and gives it to Senthamarai asking him to kill the baby and lies to Sumithra that the baby was a stillborn. Sumithra leaves the hospital without informing anyone and even Radharavi doesn't know her whereabouts.

Meanwhile, Senthamarai, a drunkard decides to raise the baby On his own instead of killing it with the intention of making some money with the help of baby. He names the baby as Muthu. Muthu gets a job in a factory which is owned by Saranraj, who happens to be the son of Vijayakumar and Sathyapriya. It is shown that Vijayakumar leads an unhappy life with his wife Sathyapriya in an estate. He feels guilty about his betrayal to Sumithra thinking she is dead and Radharavi uses this opportunity to make some money out of it.

Muthu understands that workers are not paid properly in Saranraj's factory and decides to fight against it which angers Saranraj and Radharavi. Latha, who happens to be Radharavi's only daughter falls in love with Muthu without knowing his true identity. One day, Muthu breaks the liquor bottles as Senthamarai buy dozens of alcohol bottles in Muthu's first salary. Senthamarai gets furious seeing this and reveals that Muthu is an orphan which makes Muthu worry and he leaves Senthamarai's home. Later Saranraj transfers Muthu to work in his estate present at a hill station with the plan of killing him. Muthu meets Vijayakumar in the estate and gets into his good books. During a function, Saranraj plans to kill Muthu but accidentally Vijayakumar gets hurt and is in need of a rare blood group for surgery. Now it is revealed that Sumithra is alive and she stays in an ashram. Seeing the advertisement for blood requirement, she comes forward to save Vijayakumar. On the way, Saranraj and Radharavi tries to kill her so that Vijayakumar will also die. But Muthu saves her. Now it is revealed that Muthu is the son of Sumithra and they are united. Vijayakumar is saved and he marries Sumithra with the consent of Sathyapriya.

Cast 
 Rajinikanth as Muthu
 Gautami as Charulatha/Latha
 Vijayakumar as Viswanath
 Sumithra as Bhuvaneswari
 Sathyapriya as Puspha
 Radha Ravi as Rao Bhathur
 Charan Raj as Shankar
 Devisri as Lakshmi
 Achamillai Gopi as Gopi
Senthamarai as Aarumugam
 Santhana Bharathi as Samiyar
 Janagaraj as Sabapathy
 Pandu as Ponnusamy
 Thyagu as Estate Manager
 Mayilsamy as Factory Workers
 Kullamani as Guest Appearance
 Usilai Mani as Guest Appearance

Production 
To celebrate the silver jubilee of the production company Sathya Movies, R. M. Veerappan decided to remake the Hindi film Laawaris with Rajinikanth and chosen P. Vasu as the director. Vasu made changes to the screenplay for Tamil version by eliminating unnecessary characters from the original. The film marked the first of several collaborations between Rajinikanth and Vasu. While filming the song "Nooru Varusham", Rajinikanth dressed in drag. The scene where Rajinikanth's characte expresses his sadness to Gauthami's character was shot at Gem Granites, Madras (now Chennai).

Soundtrack 
The soundtrack was composed by Ilaiyaraaja. The song "Nooru Varusham" is frequently played at wedding receptions in Tamil Nadu.

Release and reception 
Panakkaran was released on 14 January 1990, Pongal day. The Hindu wrote, "A well chalked out screenplay with effective penmanship coupled with ideal situations to suit Rajinikanth contribute to make Sathya Movies Panakkaran one of the good release of Pongal". P. S. S. of Kalki wrote the only worthy thing to remember was Rajinikanth's acting, while praising the humour and found the music to be okayish. The film ran for more than 175 days in theatres.

References

External links 
 

1990 films
1990s masala films
1990s Tamil-language films
Cross-dressing in Indian films
Films directed by P. Vasu
Films scored by Ilaiyaraaja
Tamil remakes of Hindi films